Mariental Airport  is an airport serving the town of Mariental, in the Hardap Region of Namibia.

See also

List of airports in Namibia
Transport in Namibia

References

Google Earth

External links
 OurAirports - Mariental
  Great Circle Mapper - FYML
 OpenStreetMap - Mariental

Airports in Namibia